The Fortunes of Miss Follen is a romance novel by American author H. B. Goodwin, using the pen name, "Mrs. Goodwin-Talcott". It was published in 1876 by D. Appleton & Company of New York City. The book depicts German country life and manners, with vivid descriptions of the Rhineland and of English scenery, as well as a realistic word-picture of the Oberammergau Passion Play.

Publication history
Goodwin wrote under various pen names. The Fortunes of Miss Follen (New York, D. Appleton & Company, 1876; 12mo, cloth, pp. 270. Price $1.50) was the only instance when she used "Mrs. Goodwin-Talcott". Most of the reviews were favorable, but the one issued by The New York Times was quite negative. When the novel's new edition was published five years later, this time by A. Williams & Co. of Boston, a new title was used, Christine's fortune, and the author was credited as "Mrs. H. B. Goodwin", a name she had used before and after publishing The Fortunes of Miss Follen.

Plot summary
The story opens with a description of Baden and its curious market. The heroine makes her appearance as a young and delicate market-girl, presiding over a table of dainty laces or needle work, the results of her own toil. She is the daughter of a frugal couple who cultivate a small dairy farm on the hillside. She has a male friend in the schoolmaster also, who later on would be nearer if he could, and who meanwhile with his books and talk feeds her growing culture with music and knowledge of art and of the great world outside the valley. She is an apt scholar. An early and happy love fades into a consuming grief; but an American gentleman and his wife become interested in her sweet face and pure character, and her elevation begins. They teach her English, and then employ her to teach their young daughter, Bessie, the German language. Presently, Colonel Ranney appears, a retired English army officer who wants a governess for his two little daughters, and Christine has got far enough along to prove just the one.  

The story of her blossoming out in beauty both of person and character as these changes successively come to her, is told very deftly and vividly, and in a style remarkable for its purity and its artistic use of the imagination. She is a sort of Undine, born not indeed of the waves, but of the vine-clad soil, and carrying with her everywhere the freshness and innocence of nature. None of these uplifting stages seem to be at all foreign to her, and after seeing her graceful motions and hearing her sing at her spinning wheel on her mother's porch, we feel that she has a soul within her, however she came by it, that is capable of everything which is attributed to her afterwards.  

The story flows gently on, with a plot so transparent that few readers can be long in doubt whether Christine will finally share the fortunes of Conrad Kleist the schoolmaster, or of Colonel Ranney himself; and even the happy escape of little Alice, half thrilling and wholly natural as it is, could be hardly necessary in order to draw the meshes of love closer around the Colonel's heart. He is in deep enough already. The Colonel, too, is an admirable character himself. And after he is happily located on the ancestral acres with Christine for the central light of his home, we can imagine his and her plans for the benefit of the tenantry around them. That is what they are about now, doubtless; for this picture is too realistic not to have its counterpart in the home of many an English country gentleman of the better class.

Major characters
 Christine Follen, the heroine, is a German peasant girl who is born with a beauty which gradually lifts her into refined life. She has three lovers in succession, a miller's son, the schoolmaster, and the English gentleman, who finally, in defiance of his family, marries her. His fine estate is the least of his merits.
 Ludwig, the miller's son
 Conrad Kleist, the German schoolmaster
 Herr Vassar, an American
 Colonel Ranney, an Englishman in the British Army, with no special ambitions, but with a thorough-going disposition to do the right thing when he knows it

Themes
Christian sentiment abounds in the book.

Style and genre
The novel is remarkable for its sweet, placid tone and for the absence of that introspective manner and that disposition to satire which had been somewhat overdone in the era when written. The general style of the book is notable for its crystal purity and its closeness of detail. The writer, who is the wife of a professor in a theological seminary, has evidently watched the scenes she describes, whether of home life in Germany, or mountain views in Saxony, or the Passion Play at Oberammergau, or works of art in the galleries. She is a good observer; knows what features to describe and how to group them; and then puts them into an artistic setting of pure English that is always elegant and often rises to the poetic. The book is as valuable for its information as it is interesting for its story. In this, as in some other respects, it far surpasses her previous works. The art criticisms are modest and unpretentious, but discriminating; the author manifestly bas no fear of Rubens before her eyes. The chapter describing the Passion Play at Oberammergau is interesting and valuable. The author witnessed the play in 1871, and her descriptions of it then in the columns of a religious weekly were admired and enjoyed by readers. 

According to a review in The New Englander (1876), there are a few flaws in this story. But they are all on the surface and easily detected, we example being the title. There are one or two typographical errors in the misspelling of names. The affixing of the title Herr to Mr. Vassar strikes us as inconsistent with the fact that that gentleman is not a German, but an American. If it were necessary, some cases in which the good Herr uses words in his narrative which seem too much like the elevated diction of Pope to be natural in even highly cultivated conversation.

Reception
The New York Times published a scathing review:—

References

External links
 Mrs. Goodwin-Talcott, The Fortunes of Miss Follen, (New York, D. Appleton & Co., 1876)

1876 American novels
American romance novels
Books about society
Novels set in Germany
Rhineland